The Woman of Sin (Italian: La donna del peccato) is a 1942 Italian drama film directed by Harry Hasso and starring Viveca Lindfors, Otello Toso and Gustav Diessl. It was one of two films Swedish actress Lindfors made in wartime Italy. It was shot at the Cinecittà Studios in Rome. The film's sets were designed by the art director Guido Fiorini.

Synopsis
A shady adventurer persuades his wife to steal an important invention from an Engineer she has encountered on a train. However they quickly fall in love with each other and he asks her to marry him. Tormented by her dilemma she attempts to commit suicide, but is rescued in time.

Cast
 Viveca Lindfors as La giovane donna
 Otello Toso as 	Suo marito
 Gustav Diessl	as L'ingegnere
 Alberto Capozzi	
 Nino Marchesini 	
 Tatiana Farnese 
 Giulio Panicali	
 Vasco Creti	
 Giuseppe Varni	
 Leo Garavaglia	
 Amelia Bissi 		
 Carlo Monteaux		
 Ruggero Capodaglio		
 Giovanni Petrucci
 Renato Navarrini	
 Gioia Collei	
 Carlo Ranieri		
 Liana Del Balzo	
 Armando Furlai 	
 Totò Mignone

References

Bibliography 
 Chiti, Roberto & Poppi, Roberto. I film: Tutti i film italiani dal 1930 al 1944. Gremese Editore, 2005.
 Qvist, Per Olov & von Bagh, Peter. Guide to the Cinema of Sweden and Finland. Greenwood Publishing Group, 2000

External links 
 

1942 films
Italian drama films
1942 drama films
1940s Italian-language films
Films directed by Harry Hasso
Italian black-and-white films
Films shot at Cinecittà Studios
1940s Italian films